The North Fork Kaweah River is a -long tributary of the Kaweah River in Tulare County, California. The river starts at the confluence of Dorst Creek and Stony Creek, near Dorst Creek Campground in Sequoia National Park. It flows west and is joined by Redwood Creek, which drains Redwood Mountain Grove, the largest grove of giant sequoias on earth. The river then turns south, flowing through a remote canyon, forming the western boundary of the park as far as Yucca Creek, which flows from Crystal Cave in Sequoia National Park. It continues south and passes the Three Rivers Airport before emptying into the Kaweah River at Three Rivers.

See also
List of rivers of California

References

Rivers of Tulare County, California
Tulare Basin watershed